Robert Kyoung Hur (born 1973) is an American lawyer who served as the United States attorney for the District of Maryland from 2018 to 2021. Previously, he also served as the principal associate deputy attorney general. On January 12, 2023, Attorney General Merrick Garland appointed Hur to the role of Special Counsel responsible for investigating Joe Biden's handling of classified documents found at Biden's home and at the Penn Biden Center.

Early life and education
Hur was born to South Korean parents, Haesook Hur, an office manager, and Young Hur, an anesthesiologist, in Monroe Township, New Jersey. He attended Harvard School for Boys in Los Angeles, California.  

Hur studied English and American literature at Harvard University, graduating in 1995 with a Bachelor of Arts, magna cum laude. From 1995 to 1998, Hur did graduate study in philosophy at Cambridge University. He then attended Stanford Law School, where he was an executive editor of the Stanford Law Review and won the school's Kirkland Moot Court Competition. He graduated in 2001 with a Juris Doctor and membership in Order of the Coif.

Career 
After law school, Hur was a law clerk for Judge Alex Kozinski of the U.S. Court of Appeals for the Ninth Circuit from 2001 to 2002, then for Chief Justice William Rehnquist of the Supreme Court of the United States from 2002 to 2003.

He previously served as special assistant and counsel to Christopher A. Wray, then-Assistant Attorney General in charge of the Justice Department's Criminal Division. From 2007 to 2014, he served as an Assistant United States Attorney in the District of Maryland, where he prosecuted gang violence, drug trafficking and firearm offenses, and white-collar crimes. He was formerly a partner with King & Spalding in Washington, D.C., where his practice focused on government investigations and complex litigation.

United States attorney 
Hur rejoined the federal government as a top aide to Rosenstein after Rosenstein became deputy attorney general. He was a top liaison to Special Counsel Robert Mueller's investigation of Russian interference in the 2016 election.

On November 1, 2017, Hur was nominated by President Donald Trump to be the next United States attorney for the District of Maryland. On March 22, 2018, his nomination was reported out of committee by voice vote. He was confirmed by voice vote later the same day. He was sworn in on April 9, 2018.

On February 3, 2021, he announced his resignation, effective February 15. Following his departure from the U.S. Attorney position in Maryland, Hur became a partner at Gibson Dunn, a national law firm based in Washington, D.C.

Special counsel 
On January 12, 2023, Attorney General Merrick Garland appointed Hur to oversee the United States Department of Justice's investigation into President Joe Biden's alleged mishandling of classified documents during his time as vice president.

Personal life
Hur married Cara Brewer, an attorney, in 2004.

See also 
 List of law clerks of the Supreme Court of the United States (Chief Justice)

References

1973 births
Living people
20th-century American lawyers
21st-century American lawyers
American jurists of Korean descent
Assistant United States Attorneys
Harvard University alumni
Law clerks of the Supreme Court of the United States
Lawyers from Washington, D.C.
People from New York City
Stanford Law School alumni
United States Attorneys for the District of Maryland
United States Department of Justice lawyers